Christopher Kostow (born 1976) is the executive chef at The Restaurant at Meadowood in Napa Valley, California. Under Chef Kostow, The restaurant was awarded three stars from the Michelin Guide in 2011, 2012, 2013, 2014, 2015, 2016, 2017, 2018, and 2019. In 2013, Chef Kostow was awarded the James Beard Foundation Award for "Best Chef: West".

Life & career 
Kostow grew up in Highland Park, Illinois. An accomplished hockey player, he originally had aspirations to become a professional. In his teen years he spent three or four summers working in the kitchens of the Ravinia Music Festival on the outskirts of his native Chicago, working 14-hour days making burgers and fried chicken. He earned a degree in philosophy from Hamilton College in New York. In 1999 he relocated to San Diego, where he worked under Trey Foshee at Georges at the Cove. He subsequently moved to France to study French cuisine. He worked at a bistro in Paris, the Michelin-starred Le Jardin des Sens in Montpelier, and in a former 14th-century abbey in Salon-de-Provence.

After gaining experience in France, Kostow returned to California, where in San Francisco he worked under Daniel Patterson at Elizabeth Daniel and Daniel Humm at Campton Place Restaurant before accepting his first executive position at Chez TJ in Mountain View. Chef Kostow has been at The Restaurant at Meadowood since 2008. The Restaurant at Meadowood was awarded two Michelin stars in 2009 and then three, making him one of the youngest chefs to receive the honor. In 2013, Chef Kostow was awarded the James Beard Foundation Award for "Best Chef: West". Beginning June 2017, Kostow opened The Charter Oak Restaurant in St. Helena, California.

In 2010 Kostow appeared in Iron Chef America Season 8 in the episode "Battle Oatmeal" on the Food Network. In 2014 Kostow published a Cookbook, A New Napa Cuisine which was awarded the IACP award for "Best Cookbook of the Year". The book also documents his path in life as a chef and offers an insight into his work at Meadowood. In 2018 he was awarded the international Eckart Witzigmann Award (ECKART) for "Art of Cookery".

Style
Kostow has said that northern Californian cooking is about "using the best products you can locally and showcasing them as best you can. It really is that simple. California is more about this simple elemental way of cooking that is now spreading more widely." The Wall Street Journal wrote that Kostow "expresses a holistic approach to terroir and dining in a spirit similar to forebears like the French titan Michel Bras and contemporaries like René Redzepi—a point of view that encompasses the ideas of his gardeners, ceramicists, vintners and cooks, as well as the wider Napa Valley community. At Meadowood, which uses local produce, Kostow's menu includes dishes such as "oyster with kohlrabi, beef smoked in dry onion tops, cherry trout with a buckwheat skin, eel smoked over cabernet staves, lamb-stuffed Egyptian-style baladi, or a decadent egg yolk cooked in chicken fat with homemade Marmite" and "chocolate-walnut-apple pastry cup or a beeswax-candle-warmed truffled crimeaux de citeaux with honeycomb".

Restaurants 
 Ensue, Shenzhen, China
 The Charter Oak Restaurant, St. Helena, CA
 The Restaurant at Meadowood, Napa Valley, CA
 Chez TJ, Mountain View, CA
 Campton Place Restaurant, San Francisco, CA
 Elizabeth Daniel, San Francisco, CA
 La Terrasse, Côte d'Azur, France
 Chez Georges, Paris, France
 Le Jardin des Sens, Montpellier, France
 Georges at the Cove, La Jolla, CA

Awards 
2018 Eckart Witzigmann Award (ECKART) for "Art of Cookery"
2016 Wine Spectator Grand Award - The Restaurant at Meadowood 
 2013 "Best Chef: West", James Beard Foundation Award
 2013 Three Michelin Stars, The Restaurant at Meadowood, Michelin Guide San Francisco Bay Area & Wine Country 2013
 2013 #2 on Bon Appétit magazine's "The 20 Most Important Restaurants in America"
 2012 Three Michelin Stars, The Restaurant at Meadowood, Michelin Guide San Francisco Bay Area & Wine Country 2012
 2012 "Regional Champion", Time
 2012 "Chef of the Year", Eater SF Awards 2012
 2011 Three Michelin Stars, The Restaurant at Meadowood, Michelin Guide San Francisco Bay Area & Wine Country 2011
 2010 Four Stars, San Francisco Chronicle
 2010 Two Michelin Stars, The Restaurant at Meadowood, Michelin Guide San Francisco Bay Area & Wine Country 2010
 2009 "Best New Chefs", Food & Wine
 2009 Two Michelin Stars, The Restaurant at Meadowood, Michelin Guide San Francisco Bay Area & Wine Country 2009
 2008 Two Michelin Stars, Chez TJ, Michelin Guide San Francisco Bay Area & Wine Country 2008
 2007 One Michelin Star, Chez TJ, Michelin Guide San Francisco Bay Area & Wine Country 2007

References

External links 

 

1976 births
Head chefs of Michelin starred restaurants
Living people
James Beard Foundation Award winners
International Association of Culinary Professionals award winners